The 2014 season is the Portland Thorns FC's second season of existence in the National Women's Soccer League, the top division of women's soccer  in the United States.

Club

Executive staff

Coaching staff

Roster

Match results

Key

Pre-season

Regular season

Standings

Results summary

Results by round

NWSL Championship Playoffs

Squad statistics
Note: only regular season squad statistics displayed

Key to positions: FW - Forward, MF - Midfielder, DF - Defender, GK - Goalkeeper

Transfers

Transfers in

Transfers out

See also
 2014 National Women's Soccer League season

References

External links

 

Portland Thorns FC seasons
Portland Thorns FC
Portland Thorns FC
Portland Thorns FC
Portland